Henryk X may refer to

 Henry X, Duke of Haynau (1426 – before 28 May 1452)
 Henry X Rumpold (ca. 1390 – 1423)